Lennox Football Club was a 19th-century football club based in Dumbarton, in Scotland.

History
The club was founded in 1873, and by 1876 had 57 members, 20 more than the local rivals Dumbarton had at the same stage; however, unlike Dumbarton, Lennox was not backed by a local industrial concern, club secretary Joseph Jenkins being a lawyer's clerk.  The clubs met in Lennox' first Scottish Cup tie in 1875–76 and Dumbarton won 1–0 in a replay, thanks to a goal in the last five minutes from a Galbraith shot; the original tie at Levengrove had ended 2–2, Lennox losing a two-goal lead in the final 15 minutes.

Lennox' second entry the next season was its most successful, and the club reached the quarter-finals, which, given the uneven nature of the regional early rounds, was made up of 6 clubs.  The club gained revenge over Dumbarton in the third round, despite the Sons disputing the Lennox winner, and, by the time it went to Edinburgh Swifts F.C. in the fourth, had only conceded 2 goals all season.  Despite having to play the second half with ten men through injury, Lennox won 4–0, with two goals per half; full-back Kennedy - whose corner led to the first goal - was particularly praised for his play.  The run came to an end at home to Rangers F.C., Lennox going down by 3 goals, plus one disallowed, to nil, all the goals coming in the second half and being put down to Rangers being a younger side.

In 1877–78 the club gained its record win (9–0 over Milngavie F.C.) in the second round, but it was the club's final win in the competition.  In the third round, it lost 3–0 at eventual winners Vale of Leven F.C., in front of 2,000 spectators.

Lennox was the beneficiary of an unusual reprieve in the 1879–80 Scottish Cup.   Jamestown F.C. beat Lennox in the third round with the help of Vale of Leven player Robert Paton, who was not Cup-tied, and, as the Vale was out of the Cup, was free to represent another side.  This however meant that Lennox protested on the basis that the Paton, and three other players Jamestown had "borrowed" from the Vale players were not bona members of the Jamestown club, and, after the Scottish FA committee heard the evidence, it decided that Paton had been a member of Jamestown before the first round - but that meant that he was ineligible to referee Jamestown's first-round tie with the Star of Leven club, which had already been the subject of a dismissed protest.  With this new evidence, the Scottish FA annulled Jamestown's first round victory over Star of Leven, and re-instated Star to play in the second round against Jamestown's victims Kirkintilloch Athletic , and Lennox was to play the winner in the third round.  The reprieve was short-lived as Kirkintilloch (who beat Star in the second round) beat Lennox 6–2.

Lennox' final match in the competition came in 1880–81.  It lost 2–1 to the original Helensburgh club in the first round, but the Scottish FA ordered a replay because of "an irregularity in the appointment of referees".  Helensburgh won the replayed tie 8–1.  Lennox did not play in the competition again.  It entered in 1881–82 but when drawn to play Vale of Leven the club scratched rather than face an inevitable defeat.  In January 1882 a storm destroyed the Lennox clubhouse and that seems to have been a fatal blow for the club.

Colours

The club's colours were black and white, probably in the dominant design of the day, which was hoops.

Grounds

The club played at Levengrove Park, whose surface the club maintained in better condition than any other in the region.

External links
Scottish Cup results; misses a 3–1 defeat to Jamestown in 1878–79 and the ties with Helensburgh in 1880–81

References

Defunct football clubs in Scotland
Association football clubs established in 1873
Association football clubs disestablished in 1882
1873 establishments in Scotland
1882 disestablishments in Scotland
Football in West Dunbartonshire
History of West Dunbartonshire